The men's singles of the 2012 CNGvitall Prague Open tournament was played on clay in Prague, Czech Republic.

Lukáš Rosol was the defending champion but lost in the quarterfinals.
Horacio Zeballos won the title 1–6, 6–4, 7–6(8–6) in the final against Martin Kližan.

Seeds

Draw

Finals

Top half

Bottom half

External Links
 Main Draw
 Qualifying Draw

Strabag Prague Open - Singles
2012 - Men's Singles